Saranga Rajaguru (born 12 November 1992) is a Sri Lankan cricketer. He made his first-class debut for Nondescripts Cricket Club in the 2013–14 Premier Trophy on 31 January 2014. Prior to his first-class debut, he was part of Sri Lanka's squad for the 2010 Under-19 Cricket World Cup.

References

External links
 

1992 births
Living people
Sri Lankan cricketers
Badureliya Sports Club cricketers
Nondescripts Cricket Club cricketers
Place of birth missing (living people)